
This list of African American Historic Places in North Carolina is based on a book by the National Park Service, The Preservation Press, the National Trust for Historic Preservation, and the National Conference of State Historic Preservation Officers.  Other listings are also online.

Some of these sites are on the National Register of Historic Places (NR) as independent sites or as part of larger historic district. Several of the sites are National Historic Landmarks (NRL). Others have North Carolina historical markers (HM). The citation on historical markers is given in the reference. The location listed is the nearest community to the site. More precise locations are given in the reference.

Alamance County
 Burlington 
 McCray School
 Mebane
 Cooper School

Buncombe County
 Asheville
 St. Matthias Episcopal Church
 Young Men's Institute Building

Burke County
Morganton
 Gaston Chapel
 Jonesboro Historic District

Caswell County

 Milton
 Union Tavern,

Cumberland County
Fayetteville
 Evans Metropolitan AME Zion Church
 Orange Street School
 St. Joseph's Episcopal Church

Durham County
Durham
 Emmanuel AME Church
 Geer Cemetery
 Horton Grove Complex
 North Carolina Central University
 North Carolina Mutual Life Insurance Company Building
 St. Joseph's African Methodist Episcopal Church
 Scarborough House

Forsyth County
 Winston-Salem
 S.G. Atkins House
 St. Philip's Moravian Church,

Franklin County
 Franklinton
 Dr. J.A. Savage House
 Louisburg 
 Williamson House

Guilford County
Greensboro
 North Carolina Agricultural and Technical State University 
 Bennett College for Women
 Location of the Home of William McBryar Buffalo Soldier
 Underground Railroad Marker at Guilford College

 Civil Right Museum location of the Greensboro Sit-in
High Point
 Kilby Hotel
 William Penn High School
 Sedalia
 Palmer Memorial Institute

Granville County
Oxford
 Central Orphanage

Iredell County, County
 Stateville
 Center Street A.M.E. Zion Church

Johnston County
 Kenly
 Boyette Slave House

Mecklenburg County
Charlotte
 Biddle Memorial Hall, Johnson C. Smith University
 Mecklenburg Investment Company Building

Polk County
Mill Spring
 Rev. Joshua D. Jones House

Rockingham County
 Eden
 Mt. Sinai Baptist Church
 Reidsville
 First Baptist Church
 North Washington Avenue Workers' Houses

Rowan County
 Salisbury 
 Livingston College Historic District
 Mount Zion Baptist

Vance County
 Machpelah
 Tucker's Grove Camp Meeting Ground
 West Badin Historic District

Wake County

Raleigh
 East Raleigh-South Park Historic District
 Estey Hall
 Masonic Temple Building
 Moore Square Historic District
 Peace College Main Building
 St. Paul A.M.E. Church

Warren County
 Warrenton 
 Mansfield Thorton House
 Sledge-Hayley House

Wilson County
 Wilson
 East Wilson Historic District

See also
 History of slavery in North Carolina
 List of African-American historic places

References

African-American history of North Carolina
North Carolina-related lists
History of North Carolina
North Carolina
Historic sites in North Carolina